The 111th United States Congress was a meeting of the legislative branch of the United States federal government from January 3, 2009, until January 3, 2011. It began during the last weeks of the George W. Bush administration, with the remainder spanning the first two years of Barack Obama's presidency. It was composed of the Senate and the House of Representatives. The apportionment of seats in the House was based on the 2000 U.S. census.

In the November 2008 elections, the Democratic Party increased its majorities in both chambers (including – when factoring in the two Democratic caucusing independents – a brief filibuster-proof 60-40 supermajority in the Senate), and with Barack Obama being sworn in as president on January 20, 2009, this gave a Democrats an overall federal government trifecta for the first time since the 103rd Congress in 1993.

However, the Senate supermajority only lasted for a period of 72 working days while the Senate was actually in session.  A new delegate seat was created for the Northern Mariana Islands. The 111th Congress had the most long-serving members in history: at the start of the 111th Congress, the average member of the House had served 10.3 years, while the average Senator had served 13.4 years. The Democratic Party would not simultaneously control both the U.S. House of Representatives and the U.S. Senate again until more than a decade later, during the 117th Congress.

Major events

 January 2009: Two Senate seats were disputed when the Congress convened:
 An appointment dispute over the Illinois seat vacated by President Barack Obama arose following Illinois Governor Rod Blagojevich's solicitation of bribes in exchange for an appointment to the Senate. Roland Burris (D) was appointed to the seat on December 31, 2008, but his credentials were not accepted until January 12, 2009.
 An election dispute over the Minnesota seat previously held by Norm Coleman (R), between Coleman and challenger Al Franken (D), was decided on June 30, 2009, in favor of Franken. Franken's admission gave the Senate Democratic caucus sixty votes, enough to defeat a filibuster in a party-line vote.
 January 8, 2009: Joint session counted the Electoral College votes of the 2008 presidential election.
 January 20, 2009: Barack Obama became 44th President of the United States.
 February 24, 2009: President Obama addressed a joint session of Congress
 April 28, 2009: Senator Arlen Specter switched from the Republican Party to the Democratic Party.
 September 9, 2009: President Obama addressed a joint session of Congress to promote health care reform, which Representative Joe Wilson (R) interrupted by shouting at the President.
 January 21, 2010: Citizens United v. FEC: The U.S. Supreme Court struck down limits on campaign contributions by nonprofits, corporations, labor unions and other associations.
 January 25, 2010: 2010 State of the Union Address
 February 4, 2010: Republican Scott Brown's election to the Senate ended the Democratic super-majority.
 April 20 – September 19, 2010: Deepwater Horizon oil spill
 November 2, 2010: 2010 general elections, in which Republicans regained control of the House while the Democrats remained in control of the Senate.

Major legislation

Enacted

 January 29, 2009: Lilly Ledbetter Fair Pay Act of 2009, 
 February 4, 2009: Children's Health Insurance Program Reauthorization Act (SCHIP), 
 February 17, 2009: American Recovery and Reinvestment Act of 2009 (ARRA), 
 March 11, 2009: Omnibus Appropriations Act, 2009, 
 March 30, 2009: Omnibus Public Land Management Act of 2009, 
 April 21, 2009: Edward M. Kennedy Serve America Act, 
 May 20, 2009: Fraud Enforcement and Recovery Act of 2009, 
 May 20, 2009: Helping Families Save Their Homes Act of 2009, 
 May 22, 2009: Weapon Systems Acquisition Reform Act of 2009, 
 May 22, 2009: Credit CARD Act of 2009, 
 June 22, 2009: Family Smoking Prevention and Tobacco Control Act, as Division A of 
 June 24, 2009: Supplemental Appropriations Act of 2009 including the Car Allowance Rebate System (Cash for Clunkers), 
 October 15, 2009: Enhanced Partnership with Pakistan Act, Pub.L. 111-73
 October 28, 2009: National Defense Authorization Act for Fiscal Year 2010, including the Matthew Shepard and James Byrd Jr. Hate Crimes Prevention Act, 
 November 6, 2009: Worker, Homeownership, and Business Assistance Act of 2009, 
 November 11, 2009: Military Spouses Residency Relief Act of 2010, Pub.L. 111-97
 December 16, 2009: Consolidated Appropriations Act, 2010, 
 January 27, 2010: Emergency Aid to American Survivors of the Haiti Earthquake Act, Pub.L. 111-127
 February 12, 2010: Statutory Pay-As-You-Go Act, as Title I of 
 March 4, 2010: Travel Promotion Act of 2009, as Section 9 of 
 March 18, 2010: Hiring Incentives to Restore Employment Act, 
 March 23, 2010: Patient Protection and Affordable Care Act, 
 March 30, 2010: Health Care and Education Reconciliation Act of 2010, including the Student Aid and Fiscal Responsibility Act, 
 May 5, 2010: Caregivers and Veterans Omnibus Health Services Act of 2010, 
 May 24, 2010: Lord's Resistance Army Disarmament and Northern Uganda Recovery Act, Pub.L. 111-172
 May 27, 2010: Satellite Television Extension and Localism Act (STELA), Pub.L. 111-175
 July 1, 2010: Comprehensive Iran Sanctions, Accountability, and Divestment Act of 2010, 
 July 21, 2010: Dodd–Frank Wall Street Reform and Consumer Protection Act, 
 July 22, 2010: Improper Payments Elimination and Recovery Act of 2010, Pub.L. 111-204
 July 22, 2010: Unemployment Compensation Extension Act of 2010, Pub.L. 111-205
 July 29, 2010: Tribal Law and Order Act of 2010
 August 3, 2010: Fair Sentencing Act of 2010, 
 August 10, 2010: Securing the Preservation of Our Enduring and Established Constitutional Heritage Act, 
 September 27, 2010: Small Business Jobs and Credit Act of 2010, 
 October 5, 2010: Rosa's Law, Pub.L. 111-256
 October 8, 2010: Twenty-First Century Communications and Video Accessibility Act (CVAA) of 2010, Pub.L. 111-260
 October 11, 2010: NASA Authorization Act of 2010, Pub.L. 111-267
 October 13, 2010: Plain Writing Act of 2010, Pub.L. 111-274
 October 15, 2010: Pre-Election Presidential Transition Act of 2010, Pub.L. 111-283
 December 8, 2010: Claims Resolution Act of 2010, 
 December 9, 2010: Animal Crush Video Prohibition Act, Pub.L. 111-294
 December 13, 2010: Healthy, Hunger-Free Kids Act of 2010, 
 December 15, 2010: Medicare and Medicaid Extenders Act of 2010, Pub.L. 111-309
 December 15, 2010: Commercial Advertisement Loudness Mitigation (CALM) Act, Pub.L. 111-311
 December 17, 2010: Tax Relief, Unemployment Insurance Reauthorization, and Job Creation Act of 2010, 
 December 18, 2010: Fur Products Labeling Act, Pub.L. 111-313
 December 22, 2010: Don't Ask, Don't Tell Repeal Act of 2010, 
 December 22, 2010: Truth In Caller ID Act of 2009, Pub.L. 111-331
 January 2, 2011: James Zadroga 9/11 Health and Compensation Act of 2010, 
 January 4, 2011: Shark Conservation Act, 
 January 4, 2011: GPRA Modernization Act of 2010, Pub.L. 111-352
 January 4, 2011: Food Safety and Modernization Act, 
 January 4, 2011: America COMPETES Reauthorization Act of 2010, Pub.L. 111-358
 January 4, 2011: Local Community Radio Act, Pub.L. 111-371
 January 4, 2011: National Alzheimer's Project Act, Pub.L. 111-375
 January 7, 2011: Ike Skelton National Defense Authorization Act for Fiscal Year 2011, Pub.L. 111-383

Health care reform 

At the encouragement of the Obama administration, Congress devoted significant time considering health care reform. In March 2010, Obama signed the Patient Protection and Affordable Care Act into law, the first comprehensive health care reform legislation in decades, along with further amendments in the Health Care and Education Reconciliation Act of 2010. Other major reform proposals during the health care debate included:

 Affordable Health Care for America Act (known as the House bill)
 America's Healthy Future Act (known as the Baucus bill)
 Healthy Americans Act (known as the Wyden/Bennett bill)
 United States National Health Care Act (known as the Conyers bill, a single payer proposal)
 Physician Payments Sunshine Act

Proposed
Proposed bills include (in alphabetical order):

 American Clean Energy and Security Act
 District of Columbia House Voting Rights Act
 Domestic Partnership Benefits and Obligations Act
 DREAM Act
 Employee Free Choice Act
 Employment Non-Discrimination Act
 Federal Reserve Transparency Act of 2009
 Food Safety Enhancement Act
 Gun Show Loophole Closing Act of 2009
 Homeowner's Defense Act
 Military Readiness Enhancement Act
 Native Hawaiian Government Reorganization Act
 Puerto Rico Democracy Act of 2009
 Public Option Act
 Respect for Marriage Act
 Stem Cell Research Enhancement Act
 Uniting American Families Act
 Universal Right to Vote by Mail Act

Vetoed 

 December 30, 2009: , a continuing appropriations resolution that became unnecessary
 October 7, 2010: , Interstate Recognition of Notarizations Act of 2010

Treaties ratified 

 December 22, 2010: New START (111-5)

Major nomination hearings
 January–April 2009: Senate held confirmation hearings for Barack Obama's cabinet.
 July 13–16, 2009: Senate Committee on the Judiciary held a hearing on Sonia Sotomayor's appointment to the United States Supreme Court.
 June 28–30, 2010: Senate Committee on the Judiciary held a hearing on Elena Kagan's appointment to the United States Supreme Court.

Impeachments 

 : Judge Samuel B. Kent: impeached June 19, 2009, resigned June 30, 2009, before trial; charges dismissed July 22, 2009.
 : Judge Thomas Porteous: impeached March 11, 2010, convicted December 8, 2010.

Party summary
Resignations and new members are discussed in the "Changes in membership" section, below.

Senate

House of Representatives

Leadership

Senate

 President: Dick Cheney (R), until January 20, 2009
 Joe Biden (D), from January 20, 2009
 President pro tempore: Robert Byrd (D), until June 28, 2010
 Daniel Inouye (D), from June 28, 2010

Majority (Democratic) leadership
 Majority Leader and Conference Chairman: Harry Reid
 Assistant Majority Leader (Majority Whip): Richard Durbin
 Democratic Caucus Vice Chairman: Charles Schumer
 Democratic Conference Secretary: Patty Murray
 Senatorial Campaign Committee Chairman: Bob Menendez
 Policy Committee Chairman: Byron Dorgan
 Steering and Outreach Committee Chairman: Debbie Stabenow
 Committee Outreach Chairman: Jeff Bingaman
 Rural Outreach Chairman: Blanche Lincoln
 Chief Deputy Whip: Barbara Boxer
 Deputy Whips: Tom Carper, Bill Nelson, and Russ Feingold

Minority (Republican) leadership
 Minority Leader: Mitch McConnell
 Assistant Minority Leader (Minority Whip): Jon Kyl
 Counselor to the Minority Leader: Bob Bennett
 Republican Conference Chairman: Lamar Alexander
 Republican Conference Vice Chairman: Lisa Murkowski, until September 17, 2010
 John Barrasso, from September 22, 2010
 Policy Committee Chairman: John Ensign, until June 17, 2009
 John Thune, from June 25, 2009
 National Senatorial Committee Chair: John Cornyn
Chief Deputy Whip: Richard Burr

House of Representatives

 Speaker: Nancy Pelosi (D)
 Assistant to the Speaker: Chris Van Hollen (D)

Majority (Democratic) leadership
 Majority Leader: Steny Hoyer
 Majority Whip: Jim Clyburn
 Senior Chief Deputy Majority Whip: John Lewis
 Chief Deputy Majority Whips: Maxine Waters, John S. Tanner, Ed Pastor, Jan Schakowsky, Joseph Crowley, Diana DeGette, G. K. Butterfield, Debbie Wasserman Schultz
 Democratic Caucus Chairman: John B. Larson
 Democratic Caucus Vice-Chairman: Xavier Becerra
 Democratic Campaign Committee Chairman: Chris Van Hollen
 Steering/Policy Committee Co-Chairs: George Miller and Rosa DeLauro
 Organization, Study, and Review Chairman: Michael Capuano

Minority (Republican) leadership
 Minority Leader: John Boehner
 Minority Whip: Eric Cantor
 Chief Deputy Whip: Kevin McCarthy
 Republican Conference Chairman: Mike Pence
 Republican Conference Vice-Chairman: Cathy McMorris-Rodgers
 Republican Conference Secretary: John Carter
 Policy Committee Chairman: Thaddeus McCotter
 Republican Campaign Committee Chairman: Pete Sessions
Ranking Member of the House Rules Committee: David Dreier

Members 
 Skip to House of Representatives, below

Senate 
In this Congress, Class 3 meant their term ended with this Congress, requiring reelection in 2010; Class 1 meant their term began in the last Congress, requiring reelection in 2012; and Class 2 meant their term began in this Congress, requiring reelection in 2014.

Alabama 
 2. Jeff Sessions (R)
 3. Richard Shelby (R)

Alaska 
 2. Mark Begich (D)
 3. Lisa Murkowski (R)

Arizona 
 1. Jon Kyl (R)
 3. John McCain (R)

Arkansas 
 2. Mark Pryor (D)
 3. Blanche Lincoln (D)

California 
 1. Dianne Feinstein (D)
 3. Barbara Boxer (D)

Colorado 
 2. Mark Udall (D)
 3. Ken Salazar (D), until January 20, 2009
 Michael Bennet (D), from January 21, 2009

Connecticut 
 1. Joe Lieberman (I)
 3. Chris Dodd (D)

Delaware 
 1. Tom Carper (D)
 2. Joe Biden (D), until January 15, 2009
 Ted Kaufman (D), January 16, 2009 – November 15, 2010
 Chris Coons (D), from November 15, 2010

Florida 
 1. Bill Nelson (D)
 3. Mel Martinez (R), until September 9, 2009
 George LeMieux (R), from September 10, 2009

Georgia 
 2. Saxby Chambliss (R)
 3. Johnny Isakson (R)

Hawaii 
 1. Daniel Akaka (D)
 3. Daniel Inouye (D)

Idaho 
 2. Jim Risch (R)
 3. Mike Crapo (R)

Illinois 
 2. Dick Durbin (D)
 3. Roland Burris (D), January 12, 2009  – November 29, 2010
 Mark Kirk (R), from November 29, 2010

Indiana 
 1. Richard Lugar (R)
 3. Evan Bayh (D)

Iowa 
 2. Tom Harkin (D)
 3. Chuck Grassley (R)

Kansas 
 2. Pat Roberts (R)
 3. Sam Brownback (R)

Kentucky 
 2. Mitch McConnell (R)
 3. Jim Bunning (R)

Louisiana 
 2. Mary Landrieu (D)
 3. David Vitter (R)

Maine 
 1. Olympia Snowe (R)
 2. Susan Collins (R)

Maryland 
 1. Ben Cardin (D)
 3. Barbara Mikulski (D)

Massachusetts 
 1. Ted Kennedy (D), until August 25, 2009
 Paul G. Kirk (D), September 24, 2009 – February 4, 2010
 Scott Brown (R), from February 4, 2010
 2. John Kerry (D)

Michigan 
 1. Debbie Stabenow (D)
 2. Carl Levin (D)

Minnesota 
 1. Amy Klobuchar (D)
 2. Al Franken (D),from July 7, 2009

Mississippi 
 1. Roger Wicker (R)
 2. Thad Cochran (R)

Missouri 
 1. Claire McCaskill (D)
 3. Kit Bond (R)

Montana 
 1. Jon Tester (D)
 2. Max Baucus (D)

Nebraska 
 1. Ben Nelson (D)
 2. Mike Johanns (R)

Nevada 
 1. John Ensign (R)
 3. Harry Reid (D)

New Hampshire 
 2. Jeanne Shaheen (D)
 3. Judd Gregg (R)

New Jersey 
 1. Bob Menendez (D)
 2. Frank Lautenberg (D)

New Mexico 
 1. Jeff Bingaman (D)
 2. Tom Udall (D)

New York 
 1. Hillary Clinton (D), until January 21, 2009
 Kirsten Gillibrand (D), from January 26, 2009
 3. Chuck Schumer (D)

North Carolina 
 2. Kay Hagan (D)
 3. Richard Burr (R)

North Dakota 
 1. Kent Conrad (D-NPL)
 3. Byron Dorgan (D-NPL)

Ohio 
 1. Sherrod Brown (D)
 3. George Voinovich (R)

Oklahoma 
 2. Jim Inhofe (R)
 3. Tom Coburn (R)

Oregon 
 2. Jeff Merkley (D)
 3. Ron Wyden (D)

Pennsylvania 
 1. Bob Casey Jr. (D)
 3. Arlen Specter (R) until April 29, 2009, then (D)

Rhode Island 
 1. Sheldon Whitehouse (D)
 2. Jack Reed (D)

South Carolina 
 2. Lindsey Graham (R)
 3. Jim DeMint (R)

South Dakota 
 2. Tim P. Johnson (D)
 3. John Thune (R)

Tennessee 
 1. Bob Corker (R)
 2. Lamar Alexander (R)

Texas 
 1. Kay Bailey Hutchison (R)
 2. John Cornyn (R)

Utah 
 1. Orrin Hatch (R)
 3. Bob Bennett (R)

Vermont 
 1. Bernie Sanders (I)
 3. Patrick Leahy (D)

Virginia 
 1. Jim Webb (D)
 2. Mark Warner (D)

Washington 
 1. Maria Cantwell (D)
 3. Patty Murray (D)

West Virginia 
 1. Robert Byrd (D), until June 28, 2010
 Carte Goodwin (D), July 16, 2010 – November 15, 2010
 Joe Manchin (D), from November 15, 2010
 2. Jay Rockefeller (D)

Wisconsin 
 1. Herb Kohl (D)
 3. Russ Feingold (D)

Wyoming 
 1. John Barrasso (R)
 2. Mike Enzi (R)

House of Representatives

Alabama 
 . Jo Bonner (R)
 . Bobby Bright (D)
 . Mike Rogers (R)
 . Robert Aderholt (R)
 . Parker Griffith (D, then R)
 . Spencer Bachus (R)
 . Artur Davis (D)

Alaska 
 . Don Young (R)

Arizona 
 . Ann Kirkpatrick (D)
 . Trent Franks (R)
 . John Shadegg (R)
 . Ed Pastor (D)
 . Harry Mitchell (D)
 . Jeff Flake (R)
 . Raúl Grijalva (D)
 . Gabby Giffords (D)

Arkansas 
 . Marion Berry (D)
 . Vic Snyder (D)
 . John Boozman (R)
 . Mike Ross (D)

California 
 . Mike Thompson (D)
 . Wally Herger (R)
 . Dan Lungren (R)
 . Tom McClintock (R)
 . Doris Matsui (D)
 . Lynn Woolsey (D)
 . George Miller (D)
 . Nancy Pelosi (D)
 . Barbara Lee (D)
 . Ellen Tauscher (D), until June 26, 2009
 John Garamendi (D), from November 3, 2009
 . Jerry McNerney (D)
 . Jackie Speier (D)
 . Pete Stark (D)
 . Anna Eshoo (D)
 . Mike Honda (D)
 . Zoe Lofgren (D)
 . Sam Farr (D)
 . Dennis Cardoza (D)
 . George Radanovich (R)
 . Jim Costa (D)
 . Devin Nunes (R)
 . Kevin McCarthy (R)
 . Lois Capps (D)
 . Elton Gallegly (R)
 . Howard McKeon (R)
 . David Dreier (R)
 . Brad Sherman (D)
 . Howard Berman (D)
 . Adam Schiff (D)
 . Henry Waxman (D)
 . Xavier Becerra (D)
 . Hilda Solis (D), until February 24, 2009
 Judy Chu (D), from July 14, 2009
 . Diane Watson (D)
 . Lucille Roybal-Allard (D)
 . Maxine Waters (D)
 . Jane Harman (D)
 . Laura Richardson (D)
 . Grace Napolitano (D)
 . Linda Sanchez (D)
 . Ed Royce (R)
 . Jerry Lewis (R)
 . Gary Miller (R)
 . Joe Baca (D)
 . Ken Calvert (R)
 . Mary Bono Mack (R)
 . Dana Rohrabacher (R)
 . Loretta Sanchez (D)
 . John Campbell (R)
 . Darrell Issa (R)
 . Brian Bilbray (R)
 . Bob Filner (D)
 . Duncan Hunter (R)
 . Susan Davis (D)

Colorado 
 . Diana DeGette (D)
 . Jared Polis (D)
 . John Salazar (D)
 . Betsy Markey (D)
 . Doug Lamborn (R)
 . Mike Coffman (R)
 . Ed Perlmutter (D)

Connecticut 
 . John Larson (D)
 . Joe Courtney (D)
 . Rosa DeLauro (D)
 . Jim Himes (D)
 . Chris Murphy (D)

Delaware 
 . Mike Castle (R)

Florida 
 . Jeff Miller (R)
 . Allen Boyd (D)
 . Corrine Brown (D)
 . Ander Crenshaw (R)
 . Ginny Brown-Waite (R)
 . Cliff Stearns (R)
 . John Mica (R)
 . Alan Grayson (D)
 . Gus Bilirakis (R)
 . Bill Young (R)
 . Kathy Castor (D)
 . Adam Putnam (R)
 . Vern Buchanan (R)
 . Connie Mack (R)
 . Bill Posey (R)
 . Tom Rooney (R)
 . Kendrick Meek (D)
 . Ileana Ros-Lehtinen (R)
 . Robert Wexler (D), until January 3, 2010
 Ted Deutch (D), from April 13, 2010
 . Debbie Wasserman Schultz (D)
 . Lincoln Diaz-Balart (R)
 . Ron Klein (D)
 . Alcee Hastings (D)
 . Suzanne Kosmas (D)
 . Mario Diaz-Balart (R)

Georgia 
 . Jack Kingston (R)
 . Sanford Bishop (D)
 . Lynn Westmoreland (R)
 . Hank Johnson (D)
 . John Lewis (D)
 . Tom Price (R)
 . John Linder (R)
 . Jim Marshall (D)
 . Nathan Deal (R), until March 21, 2010
 Tom Graves (R), from June 8, 2010
 . Paul Broun (R)
 . Phil Gingrey (R)
 . John Barrow (D)
 . David Scott (D)

Hawaii 
 . Neil Abercrombie (D), until February 28, 2010
 Charles Djou (R), from May 22, 2010
 . Mazie Hirono (D)

Idaho 
 . Walt Minnick (D)
 . Mike Simpson (R)

Illinois 
 . Bobby Rush (D)
 . Jesse Jackson (D)
 . Dan Lipinski (D)
 . Luis Gutiérrez (D)
 . Mike Quigley (D), from April 7, 2009
 . Peter Roskam (R)
 . Danny Davis (D)
 . Melissa Bean (D)
 . Jan Schakowsky (D)
 . Mark Kirk (R), until November 29, 2010
 vacant 
 . Debbie Halvorson (D)
 . Jerry Costello (D)
 . Judy Biggert (R)
 . Bill Foster (D)
 . Tim V. Johnson (R)
 . Donald Manzullo (R)
 . Phil Hare (D)
 . Aaron Schock (R)
 . John Shimkus (R)

Indiana 
 . Pete Visclosky (D)
 . Joe Donnelly (D)
 . Mark Souder (R), until May 21, 2010
 Marlin Stutzman (R), from November 2, 2010
 . Steve Buyer (R)
 . Dan Burton (R)
 . Mike Pence (R)
 . Andre Carson (D)
 . Brad Ellsworth (D)
 . Baron Hill (D)

Iowa 
 . Bruce Braley (D)
 . David Loebsack (D)
 . Leonard Boswell (D)
 . Tom Latham (R)
 . Steve King (R)

Kansas 
 . Jerry Moran (R)
 . Lynn Jenkins (R)
 . Dennis Moore (D)
 . Todd Tiahrt (R)

Kentucky 
 . Ed Whitfield (R)
 . Brett Guthrie (R)
 . John Yarmuth (D)
 . Geoff Davis (R)
 . Harold Rogers (R)
 . Ben Chandler (D)

Louisiana 
 . Steve Scalise (R)
 . Joseph Cao (R)
 . Charlie Melancon (D)
 . John Fleming (R)
 . Rodney Alexander (R)
 . Bill Cassidy (R)
 . Charles Boustany (R)

Maine 
 . Chellie Pingree (D)
 . Mike Michaud (D)

Maryland 
 . Frank Kratovil (D)
 . Dutch Ruppersberger (D)
 . John Sarbanes (D)
 . Donna Edwards (D)
 . Steny Hoyer (D)
 . Roscoe Bartlett (R)
 . Elijah Cummings (D)
 . Chris Van Hollen (D)

Massachusetts 
 . John Olver (D)
 . Richard Neal (D)
 . Jim McGovern (D)
 . Barney Frank (D)
 . Niki Tsongas (D)
 . John Tierney (D)
 . Ed Markey (D)
 . Mike Capuano (D)
 . Stephen Lynch (D)
 . Bill Delahunt (D)

Michigan 
 . Bart Stupak (D)
 . Peter Hoekstra (R)
 . Vern Ehlers (R)
 . David Camp (R)
 . Dale Kildee (D)
 . Fred Upton (R)
 . Mark Schauer (D)
 . Mike Rogers (R)
 . Gary Peters (D)
 . Candice Miller (R)
 . Thaddeus McCotter (R)
 . Sander Levin (D)
 . Carolyn Cheeks (D)
 . John Conyers (D)
 . John Dingell (D)

Minnesota 
 . Tim Walz (DFL)
 . John Kline (R)
 . Erik Paulsen (R)
 . Betty McCollum (DFL)
 . Keith Ellison (DFL)
 . Michele Bachmann (R)
 . Collin Peterson (DFL)
 . Jim Oberstar (DFL)

Mississippi 
 . Travis Childers (D)
 . Bennie Thompson (D)
 . Gregg Harper (R)
 . Gene Taylor (D)

Missouri 
 . Lacy Clay (D)
 . Todd Akin (R)
 . Russ Carnahan (D)
 . Ike Skelton (D)
 . Emanuel Cleaver (D)
 . Sam Graves (R)
 . Roy Blunt (R)
 . Jo Ann Emerson (R)
 . Blaine Luetkemeyer (R)

Montana 
 . Denny Rehberg (R)

Nebraska 
 . Jeff Fortenberry (R)
 . Lee Terry (R)
 . Adrian Smith (R)

Nevada 
 . Shelley Berkley (D)
 . Dean Heller (R)
 . Dina Titus (D)

New Hampshire 
 . Carol Shea-Porter (D)
 . Paul Hodes (D)

New Jersey 
 . Rob Andrews (D)
 . Frank LoBiondo (R)
 . John Adler (D)
 . Chris Smith (R)
 . Scott Garrett (R)
 . Frank Pallone (D)
 . Leonard Lance (R)
 . Bill Pascrell (D)
 . Steve Rothman (D)
 . Donald Payne (D)
 . Rodney Frelinghuysen (R)
 . Rush Holt (D)
 . Albio Sires (D)

New Mexico 
 . Martin Heinrich (D)
 . Harry Teague (D)
 . Ben Lujan (D)

New York 

 . Tim Bishop (D)
 . Steve Israel (D)
 . Peter King (R)
 . Carolyn McCarthy (D)
 . Gary Ackerman (D)
 . Gregory Meeks (D)
 . Joseph Crowley (D)
 . Jerry Nadler (D)
 . Anthony Weiner (D)
 . Edolphus Towns (D)
 . Yvette Clarke (D)
 . Nydia Velázquez (D)
 . Michael McMahon (D)
 . Carolyn Maloney (D)
 . Charles Rangel (D)
 . Jose Serrano (D)
 . Eliot Engel (D)
 . Nita Lowey (D)
 . John Hall (D)
 . Kirsten Gillibrand (D), until January 26, 2009
 Scott Murphy (D), from April 29, 2009
 . Paul Tonko (D)
 . Maurice Hinchey (D)
 . John McHugh (R), until September 21, 2009
 Bill Owens (D), from November 6, 2009
 . Mike Arcuri (D)
 . Dan Maffei (D)
 . Chris Lee (R)
 . Brian Higgins (D)
 . Louise Slaughter (D)
 . Eric Massa (D), until March 8, 2010
 Tom Reed (R), from November 2, 2010

North Carolina 
 . G. K. Butterfield (D)
 . Bob Etheridge (D)
 . Walter Jones (R)
 . David Price (D)
 . Virginia Foxx (R)
 . Howard Coble (R)
 . Mike McIntyre (D)
 . Larry Kissell (D)
 . Sue Myrick (R)
 . Patrick McHenry (R)
 . Heath Shuler (D)
 . Mel Watt (D)
 . Brad Miller (D)

North Dakota 
 . Earl Pomeroy (D-NPL)

Ohio 
 . Steve Driehaus (D)
 . Jean Schmidt (R)
 . Mike Turner (R)
 . Jim Jordan (R)
 . Bob Latta (R)
 . Charlie Wilson (D)
 . Steve Austria (R)
 . John Boehner (R)
 . Marcy Kaptur (D)
 . Dennis Kucinich (D)
 . Marcia Fudge (D)
 . Pat Tiberi (R)
 . Betty Sutton (D)
 . Steve LaTourette (R)
 . Mary Kilroy (D)
 . John Boccieri (D)
 . Tim Ryan (D)
 . Zack Space (D)

Oklahoma 
 . John Sullivan (R)
 . Dan Boren (D)
 . Frank Lucas (R)
 . Tom Cole (R)
 . Mary Fallin (R)

Oregon 
 . David Wu (D)
 . Greg Walden (R)
 . Earl Blumenauer (D)
 . Peter DeFazio (D)
 . Kurt Schrader (D)

Pennsylvania 
 . Bob Brady (D)
 . Chaka Fattah (D)
 . Kathy Dahlkemper (D)
 . Jason Altmire (D)
 . Glenn Thompson (R)
 . Jim Gerlach (R)
 . Joe Sestak (D)
 . Patrick Murphy (D)
 . Bill Shuster (R)
 . Chris Carney (D)
 . Paul Kanjorski (D)
 . John Murtha (D), until February 8, 2010
 Mark Critz (D), from May 18, 2010
 . Allyson Schwartz (D)
 . Michael Doyle (D)
 . Charlie Dent (R)
 . Joseph Pitts (R)
 . Tim Holden (D)
 . Tim Murphy (R)
 . Todd Platts (R)

Rhode Island 
 . Patrick Kennedy (D)
 . James Langevin (D)

South Carolina 
 . Henry E. Brown (R)
 . Joe Wilson (R)
 . Gresham Barrett (R)
 . Bob Inglis (R)
 . John Spratt (D)
 . Jim Clyburn (D)

South Dakota 
 . Stephanie Herseth Sandlin (D)

Tennessee 
 . Phil Roe (R)
 . Jimmy Duncan (R)
 . Zach Wamp (R)
 . Lincoln Davis (D)
 . Jim Cooper (D)
 . Bart Gordon (D)
 . Marsha Blackburn (R)
 . John Tanner (D)
 . Steve Cohen (D)

Texas 
 . Louie Gohmert (R)
 . Ted Poe (R)
 . Sam Johnson (R)
 . Ralph Hall (R)
 . Jeb Hensarling (R)
 . Joe Barton (R)
 . John Culberson (R)
 . Kevin Brady (R)
 . Al Green (D)
 . Michael McCaul (R)
 . Mike Conaway (R)
 . Kay Granger (R)
 . Mac Thornberry (R)
 . Ron Paul (R)
 . Ruben Hinojosa (D)
 . Silvestre Reyes (D)
 . Chet Edwards (D)
 . Sheila Jackson Lee (D)
 . Randy Neugebauer (R)
 . Charlie Gonzalez (D)
 . Lamar Smith (R)
 . Pete Olson (R)
 . Ciro Rodriguez (D)
 . Kenny Marchant (R)
 . Lloyd Doggett (D)
 . Michael Burgess (R)
 . Solomon Ortiz (D)
 . Henry Cuellar (D)
 . Gene Green (D)
 . Bernice Johnson (D)
 . John Carter (R)
 . Pete Sessions (R)

Utah 
 . Rob Bishop (R)
 . Jim Matheson (D)
 . Jason Chaffetz (R)

Vermont 
 . Peter Welch (D)

Virginia 
 . Rob Wittman (R)
 . Glenn Nye (D)
 . Bobby Scott (D)
 . Randy Forbes (R)
 . Tom Perriello (D)
 . Bob Goodlatte (R)
 . Eric Cantor (R)
 . Jim Moran (D)
 . Rick Boucher (D)
 . Frank Wolf (R)
 . Gerry Connolly (D)

Washington 
 . Jay Inslee (D)
 . Rick Larsen (D)
 . Brian Baird (D)
 . Doc Hastings (R)
 . Cathy Rodgers (R)
 . Norm Dicks (D)
 . Jim McDermott (D)
 . Dave Reichert (R)
 . Adam Smith (D)

West Virginia 
 . Alan Mollohan (D)
 . Shelley Moore Capito (R)
 . Nick Rahall (D)

Wisconsin 
 . Paul Ryan (R)
 . Tammy Baldwin (D)
 . Ron Kind (D)
 . Gwen Moore (D)
 . Jim Sensenbrenner (R)
 . Tom Petri (R)
 . Dave Obey (D)
 . Steve Kagen (D)

Wyoming 
 . Cynthia Lummis (R)

Non-voting delegates 

 . Eni Faleomavaega (D)
 . Eleanor Holmes Norton (D)
 . Madeleine Bordallo (D)
 . Gregorio C. Sablan (I, then D)
  . Pedro Pierluisi (Resident Commissioner) (D/NPP)
 . Donna Christian-Christensen (D)

Changes in membership

Senate

Four of the changes are associated with the 2008 presidential election and appointments to the Obama Administration, one senator changed parties, one election was disputed, two senators died, one senator resigned, and three appointed senators served only until special elections were held during this Congress.

|-

|-
| Minnesota(2)
| Disputed
| style="font-size:80%" | Incumbent Norm Coleman (R) challenged the election of Al Franken (D). The results were disputed, and the seat remained vacant at the beginning of the Congress. Following recounts and litigation, Coleman conceded, and Franken was seated.
|  nowrap | Al Franken(DFL)
| July 7, 2009
|-
| Illinois(3)
| Vacant
| style="font-size:80%" | Barack Obama (D) resigned near the end of the previous Congress, after being elected President of the United States. His successor was appointed December 31, 2008, during the last Congress, but due to a credentials challenge, his credentials were not deemed "in order" until January 12, and he was not sworn in to fill his seat until 12 days after the initiation of this Congress. The appointed successor filled the seat until a special election was held November 2, 2010.
|  nowrap | Roland Burris(D)
| January 12, 2009
|-
| Delaware(2)
|  nowrap | Joe Biden(D)
| style="font-size:80%" | Resigned January 15, 2009, to assume the position of Vice President.The appointed successor held the seat until a special election was held November 2, 2010.
|  nowrap | Ted Kaufman(D)
| January 16, 2009
|-
| Colorado(3)
|  nowrap | Ken Salazar(D)
| style="font-size:80%" | Resigned January 20, 2009, to become Secretary of the Interior.The appointed successor held the seat for the remainder of the term that ends with this Congress.
|  nowrap | Michael Bennet(D)
| January 21, 2009
|-
| New York(1)
|  nowrap | Hillary Clinton(D)
| style="font-size:80%" | Resigned January 21, 2009, to become Secretary of State.The appointed successor held the seat until a special election was held November 2, 2010.
|  nowrap | Kirsten Gillibrand(D)
| January 26, 2009
|-
| Pennsylvania(3)
|  nowrap | Arlen Specter(R)
| style="font-size:80%" | Changed party affiliation April 30, 2009.
|  nowrap | Arlen Specter(D)
| April 30, 2009
|-
| Massachusetts(1)
|  nowrap | Ted Kennedy(D)
| style="font-size:80%" | Died August 25, 2009.The appointed successor held the seat until the elected successor took the seat.
|  nowrap | Paul G. Kirk(D)
| September 25, 2009
|-
| Florida(3)
|  nowrap | Mel Martinez(R)
| style="font-size:80%" | Resigned September 9, 2009, for personal reasons.The appointed successor held the seat for the remainder of the term that ends with this Congress.
|  nowrap | George LeMieux(R)
| September 10, 2009
|-
| Massachusetts(1)
|  nowrap | Paul G. Kirk(D)
| style="font-size:80%" | Appointment expired February 4, 2010, following a special election.The winner of the election held the seat for the remainder of the term that ended January 3, 2013.
|  nowrap | Scott Brown(R)
| February 4, 2010
|-
| West Virginia(1)
|  nowrap | Robert Byrd(D)
| style="font-size:80%" | Died June 28, 2010.The appointed successor held the seat until a special election was held November 2, 2010.
|  nowrap | Carte Goodwin(D)
| July 16, 2010
|-
| Delaware(2)
|  nowrap | Ted Kaufman(D)
| style="font-size:80%" | Appointed January 15, 2009. The appointment lasted only until the November 2010 special election, in which he was not a candidate.The winner of the special election held the seat for the remainder of the term that ended January 3, 2015.
|  nowrap | Chris Coons(D)
| November 15, 2010
|-
| West Virginia(1)
|  nowrap | Carte Goodwin(D)
| style="font-size:80%" | Appointed July 16, 2010. The appointment lasted only until the November 2010 special election, in which he was not a candidate.The winner of the special election held the seat for the remainder of the term that ended January 3, 2013.
|  nowrap | Joe Manchin(D)
| November 15, 2010
|-
| Illinois(3)
|  nowrap | Roland Burris(D)
| style="font-size:80%" | Appointed January 12, 2009. The appointment lasted only until the November 2010 special election, in which he was not a candidate.The winner of the special election held the seat for the remainder of the term that ended with this Congress.
|  nowrap | Mark Kirk(R)
| November 29, 2010
|}

House of Representatives

Five changes are associated with appointments to the Obama Administration, four directly and one indirectly. Two representatives changed parties, one died, and five resigned. House vacancies are only filled by elections. State laws regulate when (and if) there will be special elections.

|-
| 
| Vacant
| Rahm Emanuel (D) resigned near the end of the previous Congress after being named White House Chief of Staff.A special election was held April 7, 2009
|  | Michael Quigley (D)
| April 7, 2009

|-
| 
|  | Kirsten Gillibrand (D)
| Resigned January 26, 2009, when appointed to the Senate. A special election was held March 31, 2009.
|  | Scott Murphy (D)
| March 31, 2009

|-
| 
|  | Gregorio Sablan (I)
| Changed party affiliation February 23, 2009.
|  | Gregorio Sablan (D)
| February 23, 2009

|-
| 
|  | Hilda Solis (D)
| Resigned February 24, 2009, to become U.S. Secretary of Labor.A special election was held July 14, 2009.
|  | Judy Chu (D)
| July 14, 2009

|-
| 
|  | Ellen Tauscher (D)
| Resigned June 26, 2009, to become U.S. Undersecretary of State for Arms Control and International Security.A special election was held November 3, 2009.
|  | John Garamendi (D)
| November 3, 2009

|-
| 
|  | John M. McHugh (R)
| Resigned September 21, 2009, to become U.S. Secretary of the Army.A special election was held November 3, 2009.
|  | Bill Owens (D)
| November 3, 2009

|-
| 
|  | Parker Griffith (D)
| Changed party affiliation December 22, 2009.
|  | Parker Griffith (R)
| December 22, 2009

|-
| 
|  | Robert Wexler (D)
| Resigned January 3, 2010, to become president of the Center for Middle East Peace & Economic Cooperation.A special election was held April 13, 2010.
| | Ted Deutch (D)
| April 13, 2010

|-
| 
|  | John Murtha (D)
| Died February 8, 2010. A special election was held May 18, 2010.
| | Mark Critz (D)
| May 18, 2010

|-
| 
|  | Neil Abercrombie (D)
| Resigned February 28, 2010, to focus on run for Governor of Hawaii. A special election was held May 22, 2010.
| | Charles Djou (R)
| May 22, 2010

|-
| 
|  | Eric Massa (D)
| Resigned March 8, 2010, due to a recurrence of his cancer, as well as an ethics investigation.A special election was held contemporaneously with the general election on November 2, 2010.
| | Tom Reed (R)
| November 2, 2010

|-
| 
|  | Nathan Deal (R)
| Resigned March 21, 2010, to focus on run for Governor of Georgia.A special election runoff was held June 8, 2010.
| | Tom Graves (R)
| June 8, 2010

|-
| 
|  | Mark Souder (R)
| Resigned May 21, 2010, after an affair with a staff member was revealed.A special election was held contemporaneously with the general election on November 2, 2010.
| | Marlin Stutzman (R)
| November 2, 2010

|-
| 
|  | Mark Kirk (R)
| Resigned November 29, 2010, after being elected U.S. Senator.
| colspan=2 | Vacant until the next Congress

|}

Committees

Senate 

 Aging (Special) (Herb Kohl, Chair; Bob Corker, Vice Chair)
 Agriculture (Blanche Lincoln, Chair; Saxby Chambliss, Ranking)
 Domestic and Foreign Marketing, Inspection, and Plant and Animal Health (Kirsten Gillibrand, Chair; Mike Johanns, Ranking)
 Energy, Science and Technology (Michael Bennet, Chair; John Thune, Ranking)
 Hunger, Nutrition and Family Farms (Sherrod Brown, Chair; Richard Lugar, Ranking)
 Production, Income Protection and Price Support (Bob Casey, Chair; Pat Roberts, Ranking)
 Rural Revitalization, Conservation, Forestry and Credit (Debbie Stabenow, Chair; Mike Crapo, Ranking)
 Appropriations (Daniel Inouye, Chair; Thad Cochran, Ranking)
 Agriculture, Rural Development, Food and Drug Administration, and Related Agencies (Herb Kohl, Chair; Sam Brownback, Ranking)
 Commerce, Justice, Science, and Related Agencies (Barbara Mikulski, Chair; Richard Shelby, Ranking)
 Defense (Daniel Inouye, Chair; Thad Cochran, Ranking)
 Energy and Water Development (Byron Dorgan, Chair; Bob Bennett, Ranking)
 Financial Services and General Government (Richard Durbin, Chair; Susan Collins, Ranking)
 Homeland Security (Frank Lautenberg, Chair; George Voinovich, Ranking)
 Interior, Environment, and Related Agencies (Dianne Feinstein, Chair; Lamar Alexander, Ranking)
 Labor, Health and Human Services, Education, and Related Agencies (Tom Harkin, Chair; Arlen Specter, Ranking)
 Legislative Branch (Ben Nelson, Chair; Lisa Murkowski, Ranking)
 Military Construction, Veterans Affairs, and Related Agencies (Tim P. Johnson, Chair; Kay Bailey Hutchison, Ranking)
 State, Foreign Operations, and Related Programs (Patrick Leahy, Chair; Judd Gregg, Ranking)
 Transportation, Housing and Urban Development, and Related Agencies (Patty Murray, Chair; Kit Bond, Ranking)
 Armed Services (Carl Levin, Chair; John McCain, Ranking)
 Airland (Joe Lieberman, Chair; John Thune, Ranking)
 Emerging Threats and Capabilities (Bill Nelson, Chair; George LeMieux, Ranking)
 Personnel (Jim Webb, Chair; Lindsey Graham, Ranking)
 Readiness and Management Support (Evan Bayh, Chair; Richard Burr, Ranking)
 SeaPower (Jack Reed, Chair; Roger Wicker, Ranking)
 Strategic Forces (Ben Nelson, Chair; David Vitter, Ranking)
 Banking, Housing, and Urban Affairs (Christopher Dodd, Chair; Richard Shelby, Ranking)
 Economic Policy (Sherrod Brown, Chair; Jim DeMint, Ranking)
 Financial Institutions (Tim P. Johnson, Chair; Mike Crapo, Ranking)
 Housing, Transportation, and Community Development (Robert Menendez, Chair; David Vitter, Ranking)
 Securities, Insurance, and Investment (Jack Reed, Chair; Jim Bunning, Ranking)
 Security and International Trade and Finance (Evan Bayh, Chair; Bob Corker, Ranking)
 Budget (Kent Conrad, Chair; Judd Gregg, Ranking)
 Commerce, Science and Transportation (Jay Rockefeller, Chair; Kay Bailey Hutchison, Ranking)
 Aviation Operations, Safety, and Security (Byron Dorgan, Chair; Jim DeMint, Ranking)
 Communications and Technology (John Kerry, Chair; John Ensign, Ranking)
 Competitiveness, Innovation, and Export Promotion (Amy Klobuchar, Chair; George LeMieux, Ranking)
 Consumer Protection, Product Safety, and Insurance (Mark Pryor, Chair; Roger Wicker, Ranking)
 Oceans, Atmosphere, Fisheries, and Coast Guard (Maria Cantwell, Chair; Olympia Snowe, Ranking)
 Science and Space (Bill Nelson, Chair; David Vitter, Ranking)
 Surface Transportation and Merchant Marine Infrastructure, Safety, and Security (Frank Lautenberg, Chair; John Thune, Ranking)
 Energy and Natural Resources (Jeff Bingaman, Chair; Lisa Murkowski, Ranking)
 Energy (Maria Cantwell, Chair; Jim Risch, Ranking)
 National Parks (Mark Udall, Chair; Richard Burr, Ranking)
 Public Lands and Forests (Ron Wyden, Chair; John Barrasso, Ranking)
 Water and Power (Debbie Stabenow, Chair; Sam Brownback, Ranking)
 Environment and Public Works (Barbara Boxer, Chair; Jim Inhofe, Ranking)
 Children's Health (Amy Klobuchar, Chair; Lamar Alexander, Ranking)
 Clean Air and Nuclear Safety (Tom Carper, Chair; David Vitter, Ranking)
 Green Jobs and the New Economy (Bernie Sanders, Chair; Kit Bond, Ranking)
 Oversight (Sheldon Whitehouse, Chair; John Barrasso, Ranking)
 Superfund, Toxics and Environmental Health (Frank Lautenberg, Chair; Jim Inhofe, Ranking)
 Transportation and Infrastructure (Max Baucus, Chair; George Voinovich, Ranking)
 Water and Wildlife (Ben Cardin, Chair; Mike Crapo, Ranking)
 Select Committee on Ethics (Barbara Boxer, Chair; Johnny Isakson, Vice Chair)
 Finance (Max Baucus, Chair; Charles Grassley, Ranking)
 Energy, Natural Resources, and Infrastructure (Jeff Bingaman, Chair; Jim Bunning, Ranking)
 Health Care (John D. Rockefeller IV, Chair; Orrin Hatch, Ranking)
 International Trade and Global Competitiveness (Ron Wyden, Chair; Mike Crapo, Ranking)
 Social Security, Pensions, and Family Policy (Blanche Lincoln, Chair; Pat Roberts, Ranking)
 Taxation, IRS Oversight, and Long-Term Growth (Kent Conrad, Chair; Jon Kyl, Ranking)
 Foreign Relations (John Kerry, Chair; Richard Lugar, Ranking)
 African Affairs (Russ Feingold, Chair; Johnny Isakson, Ranking)
 East Asian and Pacific Affairs (Jim Webb, Chair; Jim Inhofe, Ranking)
 European Affairs (Jeanne Shaheen, Chair; Jim DeMint, Ranking)
 International Development and Foreign Assistance, Economic Affairs, and International Environmental Protection (Robert Menendez, Chair; Bob Corker, Ranking)
 International Operations and Organizations, Human Rights, Democracy and Global Women's Issues (Barbara Boxer, Chair; Roger Wicker, Ranking)
 Near Eastern and South and Central Asian Affairs (Bob Casey, Chair; Jim Risch, Ranking)
 Western Hemisphere, Peace Corps and Narcotics Affairs (Chris Dodd, Chair; John Barrasso, Ranking)
 Health, Education, Labor, and Pensions (Tom Harkin, Chair; Mike Enzi, Ranking)
 Children and Families (Chris Dodd, Chair; Lamar Alexander, Ranking)
 Employment and Workplace Safety (Patty Murray, Chair; Johnny Isakson, Ranking)
 Retirement and Aging (Barbara Mikulski, Chair; Richard Burr, Ranking)
 Homeland Security and Governmental Affairs (Joe Lieberman, Chair; Susan Collins, Ranking)
 Contracting Oversight (Ad Hoc) (Claire McCaskill, Chair; Susan Collins Ranking)
 Disaster Recovery (Ad Hoc) (Mary Landrieu, Chair; Lindsey Graham, Ranking)
 Federal Financial Management, Government Information and International Security (Tom Carper, Chair; John McCain, Ranking)
 Oversight of Government Management, the Federal Workforce and the District of Columbia (Daniel Akaka, Chair; George Voinovich, Ranking)
 Investigations (Permanent) (Carl Levin, Chair; Tom Coburn, Ranking)
 State, Local, and Private Sector Preparedness and Integration (Ad Hoc) (Mark Pryor, Chair; John Ensign, Ranking)
 Impeachment Trial Committee (Kent) (Claire McCaskill, Chair; Mel Martinez, Vice Chair)
 Impeachment Trial Committee (Porteous) (Claire McCaskill, Chair; Orrin Hatch, Vice Chair)
 Indian Affairs (Byron Dorgan, Chair; John Barrasso, Vice Chair)
 Intelligence (Select) (Dianne Feinstein, Chair; Kit Bond, Vice Chair)
 International Narcotics Control (Dianne Feinstein, Chair; Chuck Grassley, Co-chairman)
 Judiciary (Patrick Leahy, Chair; Jeff Sessions, Ranking)
 Administrative Oversight and the Courts (Sheldon Whitehouse, Chair; Jeff Sessions, Ranking)
 Antitrust, Competition Policy and Consumer Rights (Herb Kohl, Chair; Orrin Hatch, Ranking)
 The Constitution (Russ Feingold, Chair; Tom Coburn, Ranking)
 Crime and Drugs (Arlen Specter, Chair; Lindsey Graham, Ranking)
 Human Rights and the Law (Dick Durbin, Chair; Tom Coburn, Ranking)
 Immigration, Refugees, and Border Security (Chuck Schumer, Chair; John Cornyn, Ranking)
 Terrorism and Homeland Security (Ben Cardin, Chair; Jon Kyl, Ranking)
 Rules and Administration (Chuck Schumer, Chair; Bob Bennett, Ranking)
 Small Business and Entrepreneurship (Mary Landrieu, Chair; Olympia Snowe, Ranking)
 Veterans' Affairs (Daniel Akaka, Chair; Richard Burr, Ranking)

House of Representatives 

 Agriculture (Collin C. Peterson, Chair; Frank Lucas, Ranking)
 Conservation, Credit, Energy, and Research (Tim Holden, Chair; Bob Goodlatte, Ranking)
 Department Operations, Oversight, Nutrition and Forestry (Joe Baca, Chair; Jeff Fortenberry, Ranking)
 General Farm Commodities and Risk Management (Leonard Boswell, Chair; Jerry Moran, Ranking)
 Horticulture and Organic Agriculture (Dennis Cardoza, Chair; Jean Schmidt, Ranking)
 Livestock, Dairy, and Poultry (David Scott, Chair; Randy Neugebauer, Ranking)
 Specialty Crops, Rural Development and Foreign Agriculture (Mike McIntyre, Chair; Mike Conaway, Ranking)
 Appropriations (David Obey, Chair; California Jerry Lewis, Ranking)
 Agriculture, Rural Development, Food and Drug Administration, and Related Agencies (Rosa DeLauro, Chair; Jack Kingston, Ranking)
 Commerce, Justice, Science, and Related Agencies (Alan Mollohan, Chair; Frank Wolf, Ranking)
 Defense (Norman Dicks, Chair; Bill Young, Ranking)
 Energy and Water Development (Pete Visclosky, Chair; Rodney Frelinghuysen, Ranking)
 Financial Services and General Government (José Serrano, Chair; Jo Ann Emerson, Ranking)
 Homeland Security (David E. Price, Chair; Hal Rogers, Ranking)
 Interior, Environment, and Related Agencies (Jim Moran, Chair; Mike Simpson, Ranking)
 Labor, Health and Human Services, Education, and Related Agencies (David Obey, Chair; Todd Tiahrt, Ranking)
 Legislative Branch (Debbie Wasserman Schultz, Chair; Robert Aderholt, Ranking)
 Military Construction, Veterans Affairs, and Related Agencies (Chet Edwards, Chair; Zach Wamp, Ranking)
 State, Foreign Operations, and Related Programs (Nita Lowey, Chair; Kay Granger, Ranking)
 Transportation, Housing and Urban Development, and Related Agencies (John Olver, Chair; Tom Latham, Ranking)
 Armed Services (Ike Skelton, Chair; Buck McKeon, Ranking)
 Readiness (Solomon P. Ortiz, Chair; Randy Forbes, Ranking)
 Seapower and Expeditionary Forces (Gene Taylor, Chair; Todd Akin, Ranking)
 Air and Land Forces (Neil Abercrombie, Chair; Roscoe Bartlett, Ranking)
 Oversight and Investigations (Vic Snyder, Chair; Rob Wittman, Ranking)
 Military Personnel (Susan A. Davis, Chair; Joe Wilson, Ranking)
 Terrorism and Unconventional Threats (Adam Smith, Chair; Jeff Miller, Ranking)
 Strategic Forces (Jim Langevin, Chair; Mike Turner, Ranking)
 Budget (John Spratt, Chair; Paul Ryan, Ranking)
 Education and Labor (George Miller, Chair; John Kline, Ranking)
 Early Childhood, Elementary and Secondary Education (Dale Kildee, Chair; Michael N. Castle, Ranking)
 Healthy Families and Communities (Carolyn McCarthy, Chair; Todd Platts, Ranking)
 Health, Employment, Labor, and Pensions (Robert E. Andrews, Chair; Tom Price, Ranking)
 Higher Education, Lifelong Learning, and Competitiveness (Rubén Hinojosa, Chair; Brett Guthrie, Ranking)
 Workforce Protections (Lynn C. Woolsey, Chair; Cathy McMorris Rodgers, Ranking)
 Energy and Commerce (Henry Waxman, Chair; Joe Barton, Ranking)
 Health (Frank Pallone, Chair; Nathan Deal, Ranking)
 Energy and Environment (Ed Markey, Chair; Fred Upton, Ranking)
 Commerce, Trade and Consumer Protection (Bobby Rush, Chair; George Radanovich, Ranking)
 Communications, Technology and the Internet (Rick Boucher, Chair; Cliff Stearns, Ranking)
 Oversight and Investigations (Bart Stupak, Chair; Greg Walden, Ranking)
 Energy Independence and Global Warming (Select) (Ed Markey, Chair; James Sensenbrenner, Ranking)
 Financial Services (Barney Frank, Chair; Spencer Bachus, Ranking)
 Domestic Monetary Policy and Technology (Mel Watt, Chair; Ron Paul, Ranking)
 Oversight and Investigations (Mel Watt, Chair; Judy Biggert, Ranking)
 International Monetary Policy and Trade (Gregory Meeks, Chair; Gary Miller, Ranking)
 Housing and Community Opportunity (Maxine Waters, Chair; Shelley Moore Capito, Ranking)
 Financial Institutions and Consumer Credit (Luis Gutierrez, Chair; Jeb Hensarling, Ranking)
 Capital Markets, Insurance, and Government-Sponsored Enterprises (Paul Kanjorski, Chair; Scott Garrett, Ranking)
 Foreign Affairs (Howard Berman, Chair; Ileana Ros-Lehtinen, Ranking)
 Africa and Global Health (Donald M. Payne, Chair; Chris Smith, Ranking)
 Asia, the Pacific, and the Global Environment (Eni Faleomavaega, Chair; Donald A. Manzullo, Ranking)
 Europe (Robert Wexler, Chair; Elton Gallegly, Ranking)
 International Organizations, Human Rights, and Oversight (Bill Delahunt, Chair; Dana Rohrabacher, Ranking)
 Middle East and South Asia (Gary Ackerman, Chair; Mike Pence, Ranking)
 Terrorism, Nonproliferation, and Trade (Brad Sherman, Chair; Ed Royce, Ranking)
 Western Hemisphere (Eliot L. Engel, Chair; Dan Burton, Ranking)
 Homeland Security (Bennie Thompson, Chair; Peter T. King, Ranking)
 Border, Maritime and Global Counterterrorism (Loretta Sanchez, Chair; Mark Souder, Ranking)
 Emergency Communications, Preparedness, and Response (Henry Cuellar, Chair; Charlie Dent, Ranking)
 Emerging Threats, Cybersecurity, and Science and Technology (James Langevin, Chair; Michael McCaul, Ranking)
 Intelligence, Information Sharing, and Terrorism Risk Assessment (Jane Harman, Chair; Dave Reichert, Ranking)
 Management, Investigations, and Oversight (Chris Carney, Chair; Mike D. Rogers, Ranking)
 Transportation Security and Infrastructure Protection (Sheila Jackson-Lee, Chair; Dan Lungren, Ranking)
 House Administration (Bob Brady, Chair; Dan Lungren, Ranking)
 Capitol Security (Bob Brady, Chair; Dan Lungren, Ranking)
 Elections (Zoe Lofgren, Chair; Kevin McCarthy, Ranking)
 Intelligence (Permanent Select) (Silvestre Reyes, Chair; Peter Hoekstra, Ranking)
 Terrorism/HUMINT, Analysis and Counterintelligence (Mike Thompson, Chair; Mike Rogers, Ranking)
 Technical and Tactical Intelligence (C.A. Dutch Ruppersberger, Chair;, Ranking)
 Intelligence Community Management (Anna Eshoo, Chair; Darrell Issa, Ranking)
 Oversight and Investigations (Robert E. Cramer, Chair; Terry Everett, Ranking)
 Judiciary (John Conyers, Chair; Lamar S. Smith, Ranking)
 Commercial and Administrative Law (Linda T. Sánchez, Chair; Trent Franks, Ranking)
 Constitution, Civil Rights, and Civil Liberties (Jerrold Nadler, Chair; James Sensenbrenner, Ranking)
 Courts, the Internet, and Intellectual Property (Howard Berman, Chair; Howard Coble, Ranking)
 Crime, Terrorism, and Homeland Security (Robert C. Scott, Chair; Louie Gohmert, Ranking)
 Immigration, Citizenship, Refugees, Border Security, and International Law (Zoe Lofgren, Chair; Steve King, Ranking)
 Natural Resources (Nick Rahall, Chair; Doc Hastings, Ranking)
 Energy and Mineral Resources (Jim Costa, Chair; Doug Lamborn, Ranking)
 Insular Affairs, Oceans and Wildlife (Madeleine Bordallo, Chair; Henry E. Brown, Ranking)
 National Parks, Forests and Public Lands (Raúl Grijalva, Chair; Rob Bishop, Ranking)
 Water and Power (Grace Napolitano, Chair; Cathy McMorris Rodgers, Ranking)
 Oversight and Government Reform (Edolphus Towns, Chair; Darrell Issa, Ranking)
 Domestic Policy (Dennis Kucinich, Chair; Jason Chaffetz, Ranking)
 Federal Workforce, Post Office, and District of Columbia (Stephen Lynch, Chair; Kenny Marchant, Ranking)
 Government Management, Organization, and Procurement (Diane Watson, Chair; Brian Bilbray, Ranking)
 Information Policy, Census, and National Archives (Lacy Clay, Chair; Michael Turner, Ranking)
 Rules (Louise Slaughter, Chair; David Dreier, Ranking)
 Legislative and Budget Process (Alcee Hastings, Chair; Lincoln Diaz-Balart, Ranking)
 Rules and the Organization of the House (Jim McGovern, Chair; Doc Hastings, Ranking)
 Science and Technology (Bart Gordon, Chair; Ralph Hall, Ranking)
 Space and Aeronautics (Gabby Giffords, Chair; Pete Olson, Ranking)
 Technology and Innovation (David Wu, Chair; Adrian Smith, Ranking)
 Research and Science Education (Daniel Lipinski, Chair; Vern Ehlers, Ranking)
 Investigations and Oversight (Brad Miller, Chair; Paul Broun, Ranking)
 Energy and Environment (Brian Baird, Chair; Bob Inglis, Ranking)
 Small Business (Nydia Velazquez, Chair; Sam Graves, Ranking)
 Finance and Tax (Melissa Bean, Chair; Dean Heller, Ranking)
 Contracting and Technology (Glenn Nye, Chair; Aaron Schock, Ranking)
 Rural and Urban Entrepreneurship (Heath Shuler, Chair; Jeff Fortenberry, Ranking)
 Regulations, Healthcare and Trade (Kathy Dahlkemper, Chair; Lynn Westmoreland, Ranking)
 Investigations and Oversight (Jason Altmire, Chair; Louie Gohmert, Ranking)
 Standards of Official Conduct (Zoe Lofgren, Chair; Jo Bonner, Ranking)
 Transportation and Infrastructure (James Oberstar, Chair; John Mica, Ranking)
 Aviation (Jerry Costello, Chair; Thomas Petri, Ranking)
 Coast Guard and Maritime Transportation (Elijah Cummings, Chair; Frank LoBiondo, Ranking)
 Economic Development, Public Buildings and Emergency Management (Eleanor Holmes Norton, Chair; Sam Graves, Ranking)
 Highways and Transit (Peter DeFazio, Chair; Jimmy Duncan, Ranking)
 Railroads, Pipelines, and Hazardous Materials (Corrine Brown, Chair; Bill Shuster, Ranking)
 Water Resources and Environment (Eddie Bernice Johnson, Chair; Jimmy Duncan, Ranking)
 Veterans' Affairs (Bob Filner, Chair; Steve Buyer, Ranking)
 Disability Assistance and Memorial Affairs (John Hall, Chair; Doug Lamborn, Ranking)
 Economic Opportunity (Stephanie Herseth Sandlin, Chair; John Boozman, Ranking)
 Health (Michael Michaud, Chair; Jeff Miller, Ranking)
 Oversight and Investigations (Harry Mitchell, Chair; Ginny Brown-Waite, Ranking)
 Ways and Means (Sander Levin, from March 4, 2010 (acting; Dave Camp, Ranking)
 Health (Pete Stark, Chair; Wally Herger, Ranking)
 Social Security (John S. Tanner, Chair; Sam Johnson, Ranking)
 Income Security and Family Support (Jim McDermott, Chair; John Linder, Ranking)
 Trade (Sander Levin, Chair; Kevin Brady, Ranking)
 Oversight (John Lewis, Chair; Charles Boustany, Ranking)
 Select Revenue Measures (Richard Neal, Chair; Pat Tiberi, Ranking)
 Whole

Joint committees 

 Economic (Rep. Carolyn Maloney, Chair; Sen. Sam Brownback, Ranking)
 The Library (Rep. Zoe Lofgren, Chair; Sen. Bob Bennett, Ranking)
 Printing, (Rep. Bob Brady, Chair; Rep. Dan Lungren, Ranking)
 Joint Committee on Taxation (Sen. Max Baucus, Chair; Sen. Chuck Grassley, Ranking)

Caucuses

Employees

Legislative branch agency directors
 Architect of the Capitol: Stephen T. Ayers (acting until May 12, 2010, and starting May 12, 2010)
 Attending Physician of the United States Congress: Brian Monahan
 Comptroller General of the United States: Eugene Louis Dodaro (acting until December 22, 2010, and starting December 22, 2010)
 Director of the Congressional Budget Office: Robert A. Sunshine (acting), until January 22, 2009 
 Douglas W. Elmendorf, from January 22, 2009
 Librarian of Congress: James H. Billington
 Public Printer of the United States: Robert C. Tapella, until December 29, 2010
 William J. Boarman, from December 29, 2010

Senate
 Chaplain: Barry C. Black (Seventh-day Adventist)
 Curator: Diane K. Skvarla
 Historian: Richard A. Baker, until 2009
 Donald A. Ritchie, from 2009
 Parliamentarian: Alan Frumin
 Secretary: Nancy Erickson
 Librarian: Leona I. Faust
 Sergeant at Arms: Terrance W. Gainer
 Secretary for the Majority: Lula J. Davis
 Secretary for the Minority: David J. Schiappa

House of Representatives
Employees include:
 Chaplain: Daniel P. Coughlin (Roman Catholic)
 Chief Administrative Officer: Daniel P. Beard, until July 1, 2010
Daniel Strodel, from July 18, 2010
 Clerk: Lorraine Miller
 Historian: Robert Remini, until 2010
 Matthew Wasniewski, from October 20, 2010
 Parliamentarian: John V. Sullivan
 Reading Clerks: Jaime Zapata, Susan Cole
 Sergeant at Arms: Wilson “Bill” Livingood
 Inspector General: James J. Cornell, until January 2, 2010
 Theresa M. Grafenstine, from July 30, 2010

See also

Elections
 2008 United States elections (elections leading to this Congress)
 2008 United States presidential election
 2008 United States Senate elections
 2008 United States House of Representatives elections
 2010 United States elections (elections during this Congress, leading to the next Congress)
 2010 United States Senate elections
 2010 United States House of Representatives elections

Membership lists
 Members of the 111th United States Congress
 List of new members of the 111th United States Congress
 Caucuses of the United States Congress

References

Notes

External links
 , Electing officers of the House of Representatives, 111th Congress
 Biographical Directory of the U.S. Congress
 111th United States Congress Congress.gov Project at the Library of Congress
 Member Information, via U.S. House of Representatives
 Statistics and Lists, via U.S. Senate
 Membership of the 111th Congress: A Profile, Congressional Research Service, December 31, 2008
 Congressional Directory: Main Page, Government Printing Office Online. Detailed listings of many aspects of current & previous memberships and sessions of Congress.